"Put Your Hands Up" may refer to the following:

 "Put Your Hands Up" (LL Cool J song), 2001 song
 "Put Your Hands Up" (DJ Khaled song), 2010 song
 "Put Your Hands Up (If You Feel Love)", 2011 single by Kylie Minogue from her 2010 album Aphrodite
 "Put Your Hands Up", song by Benny Benassi from his 2003 album Hypnotica
 "Put Your Hands Up", song by The Black & White Brothers (1998), used in "Put Your Hands Up in the Air!" by Danzel (2005)
 "Put Your Hands Up", song by Inna from her 2011 album I Am the Club Rocker
 "Put Your Hands Up", song by Matchbox Twenty from their 2012 album North
 "Put Your Hands Up", song by Nadine from her 2010 album Insatiable
 "Put Your Hands Up", song by Nerina Pallot from her 2011 album Year of the Wolf
 "Put Ya Hands Up", 2001 song by Jadakiss from the album Kiss tha Game Goodbye
 "Put Ya Hands Up", 2002 song by Bomfunk MC's from their album Burnin' Sneakers
 "Put Your Hands Up", 2012 song by Inna from the album I Am The Club Rocker
 Put Your Hands Up!, 2002 album by Chuck Brown
 "Put Your Hands Up!!!", 2019 song by Koda Kumi

See also 
 "Put Your Hands Up 4 Detroit", 2006 song by Fedde le Grand
 Put Up Your Dukes, sports television talk show
 Put Up Your Hands!, 1919 American film.
 "Throw Your Hands Up", 2006 song by Basshunter from LOL album